McDonough is a city in Henry County, Georgia, United States. It is part of the Atlanta metropolitan area. Its population was 22,084 at the 2010 census, up from 8,493 in 2000. The city is the county seat of Henry County. The unincorporated communities of Blacksville, Flippen, Kelleytown, and Ola are located near McDonough, and addresses in those communities have McDonough ZIP Codes.

History
The town was named for naval officer Commodore Thomas Macdonough and founded in 1823 around a traditional town square design. The buildings surrounding the square are intact, although there are some vacancies. The county courthouse and historic jail building are on the north side near the Welcome Center in a historically maintained Standard Oil service station, built in 1920. The station also houses the Main Street Program Office and Hospitality and Tourism Office.

One block east of the square, the town's original cotton warehouse has been replaced with the Henry County Judicial Center. In the same area the Henry County Courthouse Annex has an original oil on canvas "Cotton Gin" ( by 11 feet) by artist Jean Charlot. He painted this oil in 1942 for the town post office. His works can be found all over the world in everything from children's books to large murals.

The town was a relay station on the New York City to New Orleans stagecoach line and was connected by other stage lines with Fayetteville and Decatur, and with Macon by way of Jackson.

Geography
U.S. Route 23 passes through the center of the city, leading northwest  to Stockbridge and south  to Locust Grove. Interstate 75 passes through the southwestern arm of the city, with access from Exits 216, 218, and 221. I-75 leads northwest to Atlanta and southeast  to Macon.

Demographics

2000 census
At the 2000 census, there were 8,493 people, 3,069 households and 2,102 families living in the city. The racial makeup of the city was 61.4% white, 34.3% African American, 0.2% Native American, 1.4% Asian, 1.8% from other races, and 1% from two or more races. Hispanic or Latino of any race were 3.7% of the population.

There were 3,069 households, of which 35.7% had children under the age of 18 living with them, 45.2% were married couples living together, 18.8% had a female householder with no husband present, and 31.5% were non-families. 25.4% of all households were made up of individuals, and 8.0% had someone living alone who was 65 years of age or older.  The average household size was 2.61 and the average family size was 3.14.

26.4% of the population were under the age of 18, 10.6% from 18 to 24, 34.1% from 25 to 44, 16.8% from 45 to 64, and 12.1% who were 65 years of age or older. The median age was 31 years. For every 100 females, there were 90.3 males. For every 100 females age 18 and over, there were 86.1 males.

The median household income was $40,482 and the median family income was $46,818. Males had a median income of $34,669 versus $28,318 for females. The per capita income for the city was $19,029. About 9.6% of families and 12.8% of the population were below the poverty line, including 13.3% of those under age 18 and 18.3% of those age 65 or over.

Although it is considered to be located in Stockbridge many of the Eagle's Landing Country Club's homes are within McDonough's 30253 zip code.

2010 census
As of the 2010 United States Census, there were 22,084 people, 8,053 households, and 5,404 families living in the city. The racial makeup of the city was 34.8% white, 58.2% black or African American, 1.8% Asian, 0.3% American Indian, 0.1% Pacific islander, 2.2% from other races, and 2.6% from two or more races. Those of Hispanic or Latino origin made up 6.1% of the population.

Of the 8,053 households, 38.8% had children under the age of 18 living with them, 38.3% were married couples living together, 23.3% had a female householder with no husband present, 32.9% were non-families, and 28.1% of all households were made up of individuals. The average household size was 2.64 and the average family size was 3.25. The median age was 33.1 years.

2020 census

As of the 2020 United States census, there were 29,051 people, 8,543 households, and 5,778 families residing in the city.

Economy
Snapper Inc. manufacturing residential and professional lawn care and snow removal equipment, was based in McDonough. The company began in 1894 as Southern Saw Works, and claims to have invented the first self-propelled rotary lawn mower. The company was sold to Briggs and Stratton, which operated the plant until its closure in 2015.

Goya Foods has its Atlanta offices in an unincorporated area near McDonough.

Arts and culture
Several individual buildings and two historic districts in the city are listed on the National Register of Historic Places, including the downtown McDonough Historic District.

Events
The city hosts a Geranium Festival each springtime on the third Saturday in May, celebrating the locally grown flowers and community. The one-day festival serves as a showcase of local artistry and talent through the open-air craft markets and live musical performances. The festival is sponsored by the McDonough Lions Club, and held on the McDonough Square. 2009 marks the 32nd anniversary of the festival.

Sports 
The city's semi-professional soccer team Georgia Revolution FC plays in the National Premier Soccer League at the Warhawk Stadium.

WWE developmental territory Deep South Wrestling was based in McDonough.

Education

Henry County School District
The Henry County School District holds grades pre-school to grade twelve. The district has twenty eight elementary schools, nine middle schools, and ten high schools. The district has 1,543 full-time teachers and over 40,000 students.

Henry County Public Schools

Elementary schools

Cotton Indian Elementary School
Dutchtown Elementary School
East Lake Elementary School
Flippen Elementary School
Hickory Flat Elementary School 
McDonough Elementary School
New Hope Elementary School
Oakland Elementary School
Ola Elementary School
Pleasant Grove Elementary School
Rock Spring Elementary School
Timber Ridge Elementary School
Tussahaw Elementary School
Unity Grove Elementary School
Walnut Creek Elementary School
Wesley Lakes Elementary School

Middle schools

Eagle's Landing Middle School
Henry County Middle School
Ola Middle School
Woodland Middle School
Union Grove Middle School

High schools
Academy for Advanced Studies
Eagle's Landing High School
Henry County Evening Academy
Henry County High School
Ola High School
Union Grove High School
Luella High School

Private schools

Eagle's Landing Christian Academy
New Creation Christian Academy
Creekside Christian Academy
Living Word Christian
McDonough Christian Academy
Sunbrook Academy at Luella 
The Sharon School
Peoples Baptist Academy

Higher education
Gordon State College has a satellite center in McDonough.
Mercer University opened a campus in McDonough in 2003, and offers teacher education, criminal justice, and general studies.
Atlanta Bible College is located in McDonough.

Media

WKKP is the local radio station, broadcasting on 100.9 FM and 1410 AM; it has a classic country format.

The Henry Herald and Henry County Times are local county news print media.

Film
 The film A Madea Christmas was filmed in the town square and around McDonough.
 The television show Resurrection was filmed in the town square and around McDonough.
 Scenes for the 1989 Civil War film, Glory, were filmed in the city.
 A pilot episode for Roswell was filmed on the city square at the old Phillips 66 service station.
 The 1977 film Smokey and the Bandit was filmed primarily in Georgia in the cities of McDonough, Jonesboro and Lithonia.

Infrastructure

Transportation
Xpress GA provides local bus service.

McDonough is served by the following highways:
 Interstate 75
 U.S. Highway 23
 Georgia State Route 20
 Georgia State Route 42
 Georgia State Route 81
 Georgia State Route 155
 Georgia State Route 351
 Georgia State Route 401
 Georgia State Route 920 (unsigned designation for Jonesboro Rd)

Until the mid-1960s the Southern Railway operated the Cincinnati to Miami Ponce de Leon,  which made stops in McDonough.

Notable people

 Jordan Akins, Current NFL Tight End for the Houston Texans who was drafted in the 3rd round of the 2018 NFL Draft; was born, and presumably raised in McDonough, Georgia
 Darrell Armstrong, former NBA player; lives in McDonough
 Erasmus W. Beck, United States congressman; born in McDonough in 1833
 Travis Bergen, MLB pitcher; born in McDonough in 1993
 Herman Cain, businessman and candidate for 2012 Republican presidential nomination; lived in McDonough
 Daz Cameron, top baseball outfield prospect in the Detroit Tigers organization
 Jason Heyward, former Atlanta Braves All-Star outfielder and first-round selection in the 2007 Major League Baseball Draft; starting outfielder for 2016 World Series champion Chicago Cubs; attended high school in McDonough
 James T. Holtzclaw, Confederate general in the American Civil War; born in McDonough in 1833
 John Lunsford, politician and businessman
 Tre McBride, former NFL & XFL wide receiver; born in McDonough
 Matt Murton, Hanshin Tigers outfielder 2010–15; former MLB player with the Chicago Cubs, Oakland Athletics, and Colorado Rockies; went to high school in McDonough
 Shaquille O'Neal, NBA Hall Of Fame center; lives in McDonough
 J. R. Pinnock, George Washington Colonials guard; went to high school in McDonough
 Renford Reese, professor, author
 Andrew Sloan, United States congressman; born in McDonough in 1845
 Dalvin Tomlinson, defensive end for the New York Giants; born in McDonough in 1994
 D. J. White, football cornerback for Indianapolis Colts
 James W. Wise, United States congressman; born in McDonough in 1868
 Austin Theory, wrestler, was born in McDonough, Georgia in 1997
 Collective Soul, Band members used to live in McDonough in the early 2000s.
 McKenna Hellam, fashion model who grew up on a farm in McDonough

In popular culture
"The McDonough Road" is mentioned by Rhett Butler in the 1939 film, Gone with the Wind.

References

External links
City of McDonough official website

Cities in Georgia (U.S. state)
Cities in Henry County, Georgia
County seats in Georgia (U.S. state)